Rowdy may refer to:
Karur

Places
Rowdy Branch, a stream in Kentucky

People
Rowdy (Medal of Honor recipient), Native American member of the United States Army during the Indian Wars

Nicknames

Dale Shearer (born 1965), Australian rugby league footballer
Kyle Busch (born 1985), American NASCAR driver
Rowdy Gaines (born 1959, birth name Ambrose Gaines IV), American swimmer
Roddy Piper (1954–2015), Canadian professional wrestler
Ronda Rousey (born 1987), American mixed martial artist
Rowdy Tellez (born 1995), American baseball player

Characters
Rowdy (Dallas Cowboys), the mascot of the Dallas Cowboys NFL franchise
Rowdy the Roadrunner, the mascot of the University of Texas at San Antonio Roadrunners

Fictional characters
Rowdy, stuffed Labrador dog from Scrubs
Rowdy Burns, Michael Rooker's character from the 1990 film Days of Thunder
Rowdy Yates, Clint Eastwood's character in Rawhide

Music
Rowdy (Hank Williams, Jr. album), 1981
Rowdy (Steve Forde album), 2006
Rowdy Records, a record label

Film
Rowdy (1966 film)
Rowdy (2014 film), a 2014 Tollywood film starring Mohan Babu and Manchu Vishnuvardhan Babu
Rowdy (2022 film), American documentary about NASCAR driver Kyle Busch

See also
 The Rowdyman (1972 film) Canadian comedic film